Eduard Butenko (February 17, 1941 – September 2, 2006) - Russian actor, theatre director, teacher, theatre theoretic

Biography
On 1959 Eduard Butenko began his theatre career as an actor in "Kiev Russian Drama Theatre" when he was 18.

After graduating from the University of Shevchenko (1966) with a BA in Philology/Slavic Languages and the National University of Theatre, Film and TV in Kiev (1971) with a BA in Drama Theatre Stage Directing, Butenko has directed over 70 drama performances, musicals, various show programs, TV and radio plays.

Since 1987 E. Butenko lectured in Russian Academy of Theatre Arts (on variety department) and in "Boris Shchukin Theatre Institute".

On 2004 Butenko created "Russian Drama School" where he taught his own system. Butenko is the author of stage transformation theory, stated and published in the books "Imitation Theory of Stage Transformation" (2004) and "Stage Transformation, Theory and Practice" (2005).

Stage Productions as Theatre director

Dnipropetrovsk Russian Drama Theatre
1971 – diploma spectacle  (National University of Theatre, Film and TV in Kiev)

Ryazan Oblast Drama Theatre
1980 "Pelageya i Al'ka" «» (Author: Abramov)
1981 "The Barber of Seville" (Author: Pierre Beaumarchais)
1982 "Monsieur Amilcar"

Altai Krai Drama Theatre
1984 "Vagonchik" «» (Author: Pavlova)

Moscow Variety Theatre
1987 "Thee questions" (Author: V. Koklushkin)
1988 "Kruglaya luna" «» (Author: V. Koklushkin)

Mossovet Theatre (Moscow)
1993  "Francesco d'Assisi " Opera teatrale in 3 atti (author: Jean-Marie Benjamin).

University of Pittsburgh Theatre (U.S.A)
 2005 – "Pericles, Prince of Tyre" (W. Shakespeare)

Bibliography
 Butenko, Eduard (2004). "The Imitation Theory Of Actor's Transformation" 
 Butenko, Eduard (2005). "Stage Transformation, Theory and Practice"
 Butenko, Eduard (2004). "The Imitation Theory Of Actor's Transformation"

References

External links
Eduard Butenko
Francesco d'Assisi Opera teatrale in 3 atti
Chronicling... Pitt Rep's Pericles / October 24, 2005

1941 births
2006 deaths
Russian theatre directors